Bosiljevo is a village and municipality in Karlovac County, Croatia. It is located in the Gorski Kotar region, 25 km south-west from Karlovac, on the highways A1 and A6 leading to Zagreb, Rijeka and Split.

Settlements

The total population of the municipality is 1,284, in the following forty-three settlements (villages and hamlets):

 Beč, population 9
 Bitorajci, population 16
 Bosanci, population 40
 Bosiljevo, population 63
 Dani, population 8
 Dugače, population 14
 Fratrovci, population 31
 Fučkovac, population 23
 Glavica, population 34
 Grabrk, population 117
 Hrsina, population 41
 Jančani, population 26
 Johi, population 33
 Kasuni, population 58
 Korenić Brdo, population 2
 Kraljevo Selo, population 2
 Krč Bosiljevski, population 27
 Laslavići, population 1
 Lipošćaki, population 14
 Lisičina Gorica, population 5
 Malik, population 24
 Mateše, population 59
 Milani, population 10
 Novo Selo Bosiljevsko, population 25
 Orišje, population 50
 Otok na Dobri, population 60
 Podrebar, population 18
 Podumol, population 30
 Potok Bosiljevski, population 5
 Pribanjci, population 126
 Rendulići, population 10
 Resnik Bosiljevski, population 16
 Sela Bosiljevska, population 69
 Skoblić Brdo, population 2
 Soline, population 38
 Spahići, population 32
 Strgari, population 14
 Špehari, population 1
 Umol, population 37
 Varoš Bosiljevski, population 18
 Vodena Draga, population 37
 Vrhova Gorica, population 8
 Žubrinci, population 31

Geography 

The Bosiljevo municipality is divided into four districts: Bosiljevo, Grabrk, Prikuplje and Vodena Draga.

It is situated between the rivers Kupa (the western part lying roughly along the Slovenia-Croatia border) and Dobra. To the south, the municipality borders the Primorje-Gorski Kotar County and the town Vrbovsko, to the south-east Ogulin, to the east Generalski Stol, and Netretić to the north.

Located in the Gorski Kotar, the area's landscape is shaped by karst relief, and its most prominent features are the hills Družac and Privis (at 469 and 461 metres respectively). The geology and climate have traditionally been most suited to a pastoralism.

History 
The area has been inhabited since the neolithic, as evidenced by pottery found in a site near the village of Hrsina.
 
The earliest references to Bosiljevo are from documents dating back to the year 1334, when Ivan the Archdeacon of Gorica mentioned the parish church of Sancti Mauri in Bozilio in the constitution of the Zagreb bishopric. The Bosiljevo castle was built most likely in the early 15th century, and its first owner was Bartol IX Frankopan, member of the Frankopan family.

Cultural and historical monuments, such as the Castle Frankopan (which has been in a desolate state of frame since the Nons were expelled in the late 70's), the ruins of the castle Steljnik, old mansions, churches and monasteries yield the county a certain attraction. 

Two volunteer fire departments are presently active in Bosiljevo. The first one was founded in 1934 by Matija Bukovac. The other in Grabrk was founded in 1951. There is also a local cultural club called "Frankopan" and the hunting club "Družac".

Bosiljevo has one post office, one tavern (stand 2006), two shops and the restaurant "Bosiljevo" in Bosanci, on the old road (Rijeka-Zagreb). The most important companies are "Maier-Textil" in Bosiljevo and the saw-mill "Korenić" in Orišje. With the new roads, Bosiljevo and the surrounding area are opening up for the future.

The current Mayor of Bosiljevo County is Josip Korenić, also the owner of the Korenić saw mill in Orišje.

Demographics 

According to the 2011 census, Bosiljevo has a population of 1,284 inhabitants, of which 97% are ethnic Croats. The local dialect is mixed Kajkavian-Chakavian.

The patron saint of Bosiljevo is St. Vitus the Martyr, who is celebrated on 15 June.

Notable residents

Ana Katarina Frankopan-Zrinska, Croatian writer
Fran Krsto Frankopan, nobleman, part of the Zrinski-Frankopan conspiracy
Stjepan Korenić (1856–1940), dean and writer
Arthur Nugent (1825–1897), Austrian Oberst, Croatian Magnate and MP for Zagreb county, son of Laval
Laval Nugent (1777–1862), Austrian FM, in Bosiljevo from 1820 till death in 1862.

References

Bibliography

External links
 Karlovac County Tourist Board – Bosiljevo 

Municipalities of Croatia
Populated places in Karlovac County

hu:Bosiljevo Čazmansko